Sunil Kumar Sharma is a Nepalese politician, belonging to the Nepali Congress currently serving as the member of the 2nd Federal Parliament of Nepal. In the 2022 Nepalese general election, he won the election from Morang 3 (constituency).

References

Living people
Nepal MPs 2022–present
Nepali Congress politicians from Koshi Province
1978 births